The 38th government of Turkey (November 17, 1974 – March 31, 1975) was a caretaker government of Turkey led by Sadi Irmak, an independent member  of the Turkish senate.

Background 
After the end of the 37th government, no parties volunteered to form coalitions with other parties. Therefore, the president asked Sadi Irmak to form a technocratic government.

The government

Aftermath
The government did not receive the vote of confidence, but it continued until the formation of the next government. Thus, without a vote of confidence, it continued to rule for more than four months until the 39th government.

References

Cabinets of Turkey
Minority governments
1974 establishments in Turkey
1975 disestablishments in Turkey
Cabinets established in 1974
Cabinets disestablished in 1975
Members of the 38th government of Turkey
15th parliament of Turkey